John Hooper (1846 – 23 November 1897) was an Irish nationalist journalist, politician and MP in the House of Commons of the United Kingdom of Great Britain and Ireland and as member of the Irish Parliamentary Party represented South-East Cork from 1885 to 1889.

He began his career on the Cork Herald, and later joined the staff of the Freeman's Journal, serving as its Parliamentary correspondent for a considerable time. He entered parliament in 1885 under the auspices of Charles Stewart Parnell.

In December 1887, he was imprisoned in Tullamore Jail, along with T. D. Sullivan for publishing reports of suppressed branches of the Irish National League. He remained in parliament until he retired from politics in 1889.  At the time of his death he was editor of Dublin's Evening Telegraph.

He is mentioned in James Joyce's Ulysses when a matrimonial gift of a stuffed owl given by "alderman Hooper" is described along with a number of items sitting on a mantelpiece.

Two of his sons, William and Richard won International soccer caps for Ireland.  Another of his sons, John, was the first Director of Statistics in the Irish Free State.
His eldest son Patrick Hooper, edited the Freeman's Journal. and served as a Senator.
Hooper is buried in Glasnevin Cemetery, Dublin.

References

External links

1846 births
1897 deaths
Burials at Glasnevin Cemetery
Irish journalists
Irish Parliamentary Party MPs
Members of the Parliament of the United Kingdom for County Cork constituencies (1801–1922)
People from Cork (city)
UK MPs 1885–1886
UK MPs 1886–1892
Ulysses (novel) characters
Freeman's Journal people
19th-century journalists
Male journalists
19th-century Irish businesspeople